This list includes notable journals and magazines concerned with intellectual property (IP) law and business, and their various sub-fields, such as copyright, patent and trademark laws. The list also includes official journals and gazettes of patent offices.

Academic, by language

English

German 
 Gewerblicher Rechtsschutz und Urheberrecht
 Gewerblicher Rechtsschutz und Urheberrecht, Internationaler Teil (until 2019 in German, renamed GRUR International and published in English since 2020)
 Gewerblicher Rechtsschutz und Urheberrecht, Rechtsprechungs-Report
 Mitteilungen der deutschen Patentanwälte

French 
 Propriété industrielle

Business, by language

English

Official
Some national and supranational patent and trade mark offices publish official gazettes, in which applications, registrations, and other official actions relating to specific intellectual property rights are officially published. In some countries, publication in the gazette is required for an action to take effect. Some patent and trade mark offices additionally publish journals or periodicals, which contain more general notices, new guidance and procedural rules, and other information. The list below is of a small selection of official gazettes and journals, and indicates the publishing office after each gazette or journal listed.

Gazettes
 European Patent Bulletin - European Patent Office
 PCT Gazette - World Intellectual Property Organization
 Trademarks Journal - Canadian Intellectual Property Office
 Trademark Official Gazette - United States Patent and Trademark Office
 PIBD (Propriété industrielle bulletin documentaire) - Institut national de la propriété industrielle

Journals
 Official Journal of the European Patent Office
 PCT Newsletter

Case law reporters 
 European Patent Office Reports
 Fleet Street Reports: Cases on Intellectual Property Law
 United States Patents Quarterly

See also
 List of law journals

 
 
 
Intellectual property law journals
Intellectual Property Law